is a 　mountain of Tanba Highland, located in Sasayama, Hyōgo, Japan. This mountain is one of Hyōgo 50 mountains. This mountain is a part of Inagawa Natural Park.

Outline 
Mount Yajuro is one of the popular mountains of Tanba Highland. Mount Yajuro is a typical fault-block mountain in this area.

Religion 
Mount Yajuro has been an object of worship by the people around the mountain. On the south foot of the mountain, there was Saiko-ji temple which is said to be established in 731 by Gyōki. The temple moved to the north foot of the mountain, but burned in the war. On the north foot of the mountain there is Hahakabe shrine and today we can find a monument to show the shrine has their own area in the mountain.

Route 
There are several routes to the top of the mountain. The easiest route is from Hōkabemae Bus Stop of Shinki Bus via Yakushinogahara Camping place. It takes about two hours. Another route is from Ushiroguchi Bus Stop, it takes one and half hours. The other route is from Shimo-Kagonobo..

Access 
 Hōkabemae Bus Stop of Shinki Bus
 Ushiroguchi Bus Stop of Shinnki Bus
 Shimo-Kagonobo Bus Stop of Shinki Bus

Gallery

References
 Hokusetsu, Kyoto Nishiyama, Shobunsha, 2007
 Official Home Page of the Geographical Survey Institute in Japan

Yajurogatake